Seducia is the fourth studio album by the Finnish gothic metal band Silentium. The album was released in Finland on January 25, worldwide on January 27 and on April 23 in Germany, Austria, and Switzerland. It is their first album featuring an appearance by female singer Riina Rinkinen. The album has so far spawned two singles: "Frostnight" and "Dead Silent".

Critical reception

The reviewer for the Canadian Exclaim! magazine wrote that the album presented both "bombasticism" and sensuality, but noted an occasional drag in the songs. The German edition of metal hammer Metal Hammer marked the production and musical quality of the album, and compared singer Rinkinen to Helen Vogt of Flowing Tears. Also the RockHard magazine lauded Riina Rinkinen's addition to the Personnel and noted that the band had now reduced the kitsch of previous releases.

Track listing 
Seducia features the following tracks:

Personnel
 Matti Aikio – vocals, bass     
 Sami Boman – keyboard, backing vocals     
 Elias Kahila – cello     
 Toni Lahtinen – guitar   
 Juha Lehtioksa – guitar     
 Jari Ojala – drums
 Riina Rinkinen – vocals

References

External links
 Silentium Official Site

2006 albums
Silentium albums